More commonly referred to as the IEC, the International Extension College is a defunct non-profit organization that was based in Cambridge in the UK. Its primary aim was to help set up and manage distance learning educational initiatives in developing countries.

In the years since its inception, the IEC helped to set up many organizations, and often worked in partnership with a variety of others including NGOs, educational establishments and governments. Some of the projects include:
The Women in Fishing Industry Project (WIFIP), working with fishing communities around Lake Victoria in Kenya, using radio education to improve health.
The Building Literacy in Sudan Project (BLSP), working with refugees in camps and settlements across Northern Sudan.
The Building Capacity at Kyambogo University Project, working towards improvements in teacher education in Uganda by providing access to quality teacher training.
Various other projects.

References
Press Release announcing that IEC will cease to be active from 31 March 2006.

External links 
IEC official website
Article from Massey University magazine about the role of IEC educational consultant, Tony Wrightson
The National Extension College - Further Education Distance Learning in the UK
The Open University - Higher Education Distance Learning in the UK

Distance education institutions based in the United Kingdom
Defunct educational institutions in the United Kingdom